Sang-wook is a Korean masculine given name. Its meaning differs based on the hanja used to write each syllable of the name.

Hanja
There are 35 hanja with the reading "sang" and 11 hanja with the reading "wook" on the South Korean government's official list of hanja which may be registered for use in given names. Ways of writing this name in hanja include:

 (서로 상 seoro sang, 아침 해 욱 achim hae uk): "together with the morning sun"
 (서로 상 seoro sang, 햇빛 밝을 욱 haetbit balgeul uk): "together with the sunshine"
 (오히려 상 ohiryeo sang, 빛날 욱 binnal uk)

People
People with this name include:
Kim Sang-wook (fencer) (born 1964), South Korean fencer
Ji Sang-wook (born 1965), South Korean politician (Saenuri Party)
Lee Sang-wook (born 1971), Korean American actor known as Will Yun Lee
Park Sang-wook (actor) (born 1976), South Korean actor
Joo Sang-wook (born 1978), South Korean actor
Jeon Sang-wook (footballer) (born 1979), South Korean football player
Kevin Na (born Na Sangwook, 1983), South Korean-born American golfer
Lee Sang-wook (born 1985), South Korean artistic gymnast
Park Sang-wook (born 1986), South Korean football player
Jeon Sang-wook (esports player) (born 1987), South Korean professional StarCraft player
Kim Sang-wook (born 1988), South Korean ice hockey player
Sang-Wook Cheong, South Korean materials scientist at Rutgers University

See also
List of Korean given names

References

Korean masculine given names